The Lobito Oil Refinery (Portuguese: Refinaria do Lobito), is a crude oil  refinery planned in Angola. The oil infrastructure facility is under development by Sonangol, the national oil company of Angola.

Location

Background
As of October 2021, Angola was producing approximately 1,200,000 barrels of crude oil daily, with production capacity expected to increase as new fields come online. At the same time, the country spent over US$1.7 billion on oil products imports into the country annually.

The Angolan authorities plan to ramp up local refining capacity to 360,000 barrels daily in the short term. After meeting local demand, the refined oil products will be marketed to neighboring countries, with focus on the Democratic Republic of the Congo and Zambia. Feasibility studies to build a pipeline from this refinery to Zambia, the Lobito–Lusaka Oil Products Pipeline, are ongoing as of 2022.

Ownership
The government of Angola is in search of a strategic investor to assume a controlling stake in the development project. As of July 2022, the ownership of Lobito Oil Refinery is as illustrated in the table below.

Construction
The tender for the engineering, procurement and construction (EPC) contractor yielded five international consortia, who will be winnowed down in further tendering stages.

See also
 Uganda Oil Refinery

References

External links
 Official Website

Oil refineries in Angola
Buildings and structures in Benguela Province
Proposed energy infrastructure in Africa
Petroleum infrastructure in Angola